Reyes Estévez López (born 2 August 1976 in Cornellà de Llobregat, Spain) is a Spanish 1500 metres runner. He won the European Championships' final 1998 in Budapest. In addition, he won bronze medals at the 1997 World Championships, 1999 World Championships and 2005 European Indoor Championships (both 1500 and 3000 m) and silver medals at the 2001 IAAF World Indoor Championships and 2002 European Championships.

On 9 December 2010 Reyes Estévez López was arrested and questioned in relation to his involvement in a Spanish sports doping ring as part of the Guardia Civil's Operation Galgo.

Achievements

References

External links

1976 births
Living people
Athletes from Catalonia
Spanish male middle-distance runners
Athletes (track and field) at the 1996 Summer Olympics
Athletes (track and field) at the 2004 Summer Olympics
Athletes (track and field) at the 2008 Summer Olympics
Olympic athletes of Spain
World Athletics Championships medalists
European Athletics Championships medalists
Mediterranean Games bronze medalists for Spain
Mediterranean Games medalists in athletics
Athletes (track and field) at the 1997 Mediterranean Games